New York Communities for Change (NYCC) is a 501(c)(4) nonprofit focused on "building power for low and moderate-income communities in New York State". Issues described on the organization's website include affordable housing, worker and immigrant rights, improving public education, Wall Street accountability, and green energy.

History 
Funding for the Association of Community Organizations for Reform Now (ACORN) suffered considerably following the 2009 James O'Keefe scandal, which later was found to be funded by billionaire investor Peter Thiel. Though District Attorney Charles J. Hynes ruled that no criminality had been found in his investigation of the three ACORN employees featured in the heavily edited video footage, the damage left ACORN underfunded and defunct. In 2010, its New York chapter formed New York Communities for Change under executive director Jon Kest and initial board chair Marie Pierre.

In 2012, when Jon Kest died from cancer, Jonathan Westin succeeded him and currently serves as the executive director.

Issues and actions

Affordable housing and preservation 
In 2010, the Department of Housing and Urban Development instituted the Distressed Asset Stabilization Program to deal with delinquent loans by running auctions to sell these loans in bulk at a severe discount, hundreds at a time, to the highest bidder. The proceeds from the 100,000 loans sold as of 2014 bolstered the FHA insurance fund by $8.8 billion. Nearly 98% of these loan sales went to banks, hedge funds, or private equity firms which led to firms like Blackstone becoming America's largest landlords who bought single-family homes and rented them out at a profit. Since his appointment, Julian Castro has become a target to be held accountable for the Department's actions under his leadership.

East New York Councilman Rafael Espinal also became a protest target for his involvement in rezoning his Brooklyn neighborhood. Although roughly a third of East New York residents do not make enough to qualify for most affordable housing units, Councilman Espinal voted for the city's new mandatory inclusionary housing rules which granted developers density bonuses.

NYCC also has publicly outed the New York State Association for Affordable Housing for its role in gentrifying neighborhoods, and demanded that the city rely on nonprofit developers to increase the stock of below-market-rate housing.

In June 2016, the group protested outside the homes of Ron Moelis of L+M Development Partners to launch their Real Gentrifiers campaign. Moelis is a member of NYSAFAH and the developer behind the Essex Crossing complex on the Lower East Side. He previously had been targeted by construction unions for preferring non-union workers who work for lower wages and often attempting to buy elections as a way to rig housing and development policy in their favor.

Good jobs and living wages 
When the movement for a fair economy started in 2011 by the Service Employees International Union, NYCC began surveying low-income residents about affordable housing and found many of the most destitute workers to be in the fast food industry which at the time employed close to three million people. Strikes began in late 2012 where fast-food workers took to the streets of New York City and risked being fired. The demonstrations then spread to Chicago, St. Louis, Detroit, Milwaukee and beyond, until a year later when a nationwide one-day strike calling for $15 minimum wage and a fast food workers' union took place in more than 100 cities. In April 2016, Governor Andrew Cuomo signed legislation enacting a statewide $15 minimum wage plan and a 12-week paid family leave policy.

NYCC's car wash workers in New York City have won collective bargaining at 10 businesses, including the first car washes on the East Coast to unionize. Long term guarantees of wages and benefits, along with independent wage hikes across the industry, have resulted in millions of dollars raised for immigrant workers occupying car washes. The car wash campaign, conducted jointly with Make the Road New York and Retail Wholesale and Department Store Union, also led to the historic passage of legislation in 2015 which for the first time required car washes to be licensed as well as meet environmental and workplace standards.

In 2015, in close collaboration with the Taxi Workers Alliance, NYCC launched a campaign to transform workplace in the access, or temporary work, recognizing that companies like Uber were shortchanging its low-income workforce. The campaign argues that the company evades payroll taxes by designating their workers as "independent contractors" even though Uber sets its own prices and rules for ride-sharing transactions, and that by finding a loophole around the National Labor Relations Act, they fail to give their workers basic labor protections, such as a minimum wage, overtime compensation, and unemployment compensation. One recent study showed that these drivers made as little as $2.89 per hour after Uber cut fares. The organization has also partnered with Amazon workers in their successful push for a $15/hour minimum wage.

Wall street and hedge fund accountability 

In February 2015, NYCC launched the Hedge Clippers campaign to uncover the mechanisms used by hedge funds and billionaires to influence politics. Formed with Strong Economy for All and Alliance for Quality Education, the coalition has released comprehensive reports on hedge fund magnates who evade taxes after building luxury developments in New York City and undercut the public education system. Since its launch, the Hedge Clippers campaign has exposed nearly 100 individuals and their ties to the fossil fuel industry, housing loopholes, Puerto Rico debt crisis, public pension investments, and political campaigns including Paul Tudor Jones II, Daniel S. Loeb, and Paul Singer who "bleed the economy through self-interested practice and then extend the damage through the lavish purchase of political influence."

References

2010 establishments in New York City
Human rights organizations based in the United States
Advocacy groups in the United States
Non-profit organizations based in Brooklyn